The Kenya women's national basketball team represents Kenya in international competitions. Internationally they are known as the Kenyan Lionesses. It is administrated by the Kenya Basketball Federation (KBF).

African Championship record
1986 – 5th
1993 – 2nd
1997 – 4th
2007 – 12th
2013 – 10th
2019 – 11th
2021 – 9th

Team

Current roster
Roster for the 2021 Women's Afrobasket.

Head coach position
  George Mayienga – 2021–present

2023 FIBA Women's AfroBasket Qualifiers
From the 14th till the 19th February the Kenyan women's team competed in the 2023 FIBA Women's AfroBaskt Qualifiers in Kampala, Uganda. The team finished with 4 wins and 1 loss, coming third in the tournament. Unfortunately they did not progress to the 2023 FIBA Women's AfroBasket, set to be held later this year in Kigali, Rwanda from the 28th July till the 6th August 2023.

See also
 Kenya women's national under-19 basketball team
 Kenya women's national under-17 basketball team
 Kenya women's national 3x3 team

References

External links
FIBA profile
Africabasket: Kenya women national team
Kenya Basketball Records at FIBA Archive

Women's national basketball teams
Basketball
Basketball in Kenya
Basketball teams in Kenya